The Ch'anghŭng Line is an electrified standard-gauge secondary line of the Korean State Railway in South Hamgyŏng Province, North Korea, running from Ch'anghŭng on the P'yŏngra Line to Ryŏnhŭng.

Route
A yellow background in the "Distance" box indicates that section of the line is not electrified.

References

Railway lines in North Korea
Standard gauge railways in North Korea